El Viso is a neighborhood of Madrid, part of the Chamartín District. Consisting mainly of residential detached houses, it is currently the wealthiest neighborhood of the Spanish capital, overtaking the Salamanca District. Aristocrats, businessmen, politicians and diplomats have inhabited this area for half a century. The neighborhood also hosts the main headquarters of the Spanish National Research Council (CSIC).

As of 1 March 2020, it has a population of 17,502
.

See also 
 Church of San Agustín (Madrid)
 Monument to José Martí (Madrid)

References

Wards of Madrid
Chamartín (Madrid)